Šarruma or Sharruma was a Hurrian mountain god, who was also worshipped by the Hittites and Luwians.

Name
The original source and meaning of the name is unknown. In Hittite and Hurrian texts, his name was linked with the Akkadian šarri ("King") and could be written with the Sumerogram for King, LUGAL-ma. In Hieroglyphic Luwian, his name was written with a pair of walking legs, which is transcribed as SARMA.

Description 
Šarruma is a son of the weather-god Teshub and the goddess Ḫepat and brother of the goddess Inara. He is often depicted riding a tiger or panther and carrying an axe (cf. labrys). He is depicted behind his father on the Illuyanka's relief found in Malatya (dating 1050-850 BC), on display in the Museum of Anatolian Civilizations in Ankara, Turkey. His wife is the daughter of the dragon Illuyanka.

Development 
Šarruma was originally a bull-shaped mountain god of the Anatolian borderlands. Early research suggested that Šarruma was originally the partner of the goddess Ḫepat and had subsequently been replaced by Teššup and demoted to be the goddess' son. Newer research indicates that Ḫepat was always the partner of the weather god of Aleppo and that early depictions of Ḫepat and Šarruma as a pair understood them as mother and son.

Hittites 
There was a prince named after him: Ašmi-Šarruma, son of king Arnuwanda I. After the Hittite (hurrian origin) king Šuppiluliuma I installed his son Telipinu as Priest of Aleppo, the cult of Šarruma was adopted and became popular among the Hittites. Another Hurrian-Hittite King Tudḫaliya IV chose him as his personal guardian god, while his father's wife Puduḫepa had a dream in which she vowed to build twelve shrines for him in the mountains. The seal of Mursili III as crown prince depicted him being embraced by Šarruma. In the procession of the Hittite gods at Yazılıkaya, he stands behind his mother on a leopard and is depicted in chamber B as Tudḫaliya's protector. On the Hanyeri relief he is depicted in the form of a bull. As the double god Šarrumanni, Šarruma was invoked as an intermediary and protector.

Luwians
In the Iron Age, Šarruma continued to be worshipped in Syria and Southern Anatolia.

See also

 Hittite mythology
 Hurrian mythology

References

Further reading 
 Laroche E. "Le dieu anatolien Sarrumma". In: Syria. Tome 40 fascicule 3-4, 1963. pp. 277–302. [DOI: https://doi.org/10.3406/syria.1963.8468] ; www.persee.fr/doc/syria_0039-7946_1963_num_40_3_8468

Hurrian deities
Hittite deities
Ugaritic deities
Mountain gods